The 1984–85 Southern Jaguars basketball team represented Southern University during the 1984–85 NCAA Division I men's basketball season. The Jaguars, led by head coach Robert Hopkins, played their home games at the F. G. Clark Center and were members of the Southwestern Athletic Conference. They finished the season 19–11, 9–5 in SWAC play to finish in second place. They were champions of the SWAC tournament to earn an automatic bid to the 1985 NCAA tournament where they lost in the opening round to No. 1 seed St. John's.

Roster

Schedule

|-
!colspan=9 style=| Regular season

|-
!colspan=9 style=| 1985 SWAC tournament

|-
!colspan=9 style=|1985 NCAA tournament

References

Southern Jaguars basketball seasons
Southern
Southern
South
South